The 2013 Matsumoto Yamaga FC season sees Matsumoto Yamaga compete in J. League Division 2. Matsumoto Yamaga are also competing in the 2013 Emperor's Cup.

Players

Current squad

Pre-season Transfers

Mid-season Transfers

Competitions

J. League

League table

Matches

Emperor's Cup

References
2013 J.League Division 2 Fixture

Matsumoto Yamaga FC
Matsumoto Yamaga FC seasons